Al McCoy may refer to:

Al McCoy (announcer) (born 1933), American radio broadcast announcer of Phoenix Suns NBA basketball games
Al McCoy (baseball) (1928–2006), American baseball player
Al McCoy (boxer), Alexander, (1894–1966), American boxer

See also
Alfred McCoy (disambiguation)